The Scotland national football B team, controlled by the Scottish Football Association, is run occasionally as a second team for the Scotland national football team. During the period when Berti Vogts was manager of the national team, it was also known as the Scotland Future team.

Concept and history

A national B team is designed to give games to players who are being considered for call-up to the full national squad. Generally, the team plays in friendly matches against other international B teams. These games are often played at smaller venues than the full national team play at, with attendances generally under 10,000.

The team is also sometimes referred to as the Scotland Future team, a concept initiated by Berti Vogts. The team competed in the Future Team Cup in 2002–03 and from 2004 to 2006. Following the departure of Berti Vogts in 2004, Scotland's next manager Walter Smith stated his intention to stop playing these matches due to fixture congestion and the number of player withdrawals. Since 2006, there have been four official B internationals played by Scotland.

The first Scotland B game was held on 11 November 1952 and was a 0–0 draw with France B in Toulouse. As of April 2019, the Scotland B side have played 27 games. The most recent match was against Northern Ireland on 6 May 2009. The squad selection was restricted by two Scottish Premier League games being scheduled for the following day, and an upcoming Old Firm match. George Boyd was added to the squad after his eligibility to play for Scotland was confirmed. Six players withdrew from the original squad and four players were added to fill the gaps left behind. Scotland B won the match 3–0 thanks to goals by Andy Webster, George Boyd and Leigh Griffiths.

Tournament history

Results and fixtures

References

External links
 Scotland B Team fitbastats.com. Contains full results archive

B
European national B association football teams